The Russian Astronomical Society ( was a society established in Saint Petersburg, Russia in 1891 for the promotion of astronomy related studies. In 1894 the society also started publishing the scientific "Journal of the Russian Astronomical Society"

In 1932 the Society was transformed into the Unional Astronomical and Geophysical Society.

See also
 List of astronomical societies

References

Astronomy organizations
Scientific societies based in Russia
Organizations established in 1891
Organizations disestablished in 1932
Astronomy in Russia